The Kanet is a caste found in the state of Himachal Pradesh in North India.
They are generally regarded as a Thakur (noble) caste, even though they have sometimes been classified otherwise.There is the subcaste of kanets which is known as "Mukhiya".

Kanet/Kunait is one of the Rajput Clans Native to East Himachal. Kanets Claim themselves to be the Descendants of Hill Rajas of an Ancient Kingdom.
Ethnically and linguistically, Kanet/Kunet Rajputs residing in middle and lower hills of Himachal are of an Indo-Aryan stock such as other Rajput clans, but there are also mixed Mongoloid-Tibetian stock of Kanets in Kinnaur and Lahul.
Kanet/Kunait Rajputs that are of indo aryan stock are the Landlords and are known by the title Thakur, Although during British times they were considered one of the agriculturalist castes of Himachal like Ghirth. The term agricultural tribe, according to the Punjab Land Alienation Act, 1900, was at that time synonymous with martial race.
Recent genetic analysis showed close genetic affinities b/w the Brahmins and Hill Rajputs with Thakur Kanets.

Etymology
The modern Name "Kanet/kunet/Kunait" is an Apabhramsha of Kuninda or Kunid
[कुणिन्द/कुणीद/कुनिद ~ कुनेत/कुनैत/कनेत]

Ku/कु changed to ka/क Or ku/कु
ñi/णि changed to nē/णे/ने/नै
Da/द changed to ta/त

Origin
According to a theory of their origin Kanets are descendants of Kuninda (कुणिन्द/कुणीद) Dynasty which once ruled the Parts of East Himachal and to Kumaun region of Uttrakhand for a very long time till the rise of Gupta Empire and before the arrival of Medieval Era(6thCE-12thCE) Rajput Clans Chauhan, Parmar, Chandel from Central And North India.
The Kingdom of Kunindas is also mentioned in Mahabharata as Kulinda.They were Defeated by the Arjuna. Kunindas are also mentioned by Panini in his Ashtadhyayi. A Kulinda/Kuninda chief named  Subahu/सुबाहु' is mentioned in Mahabharata who joined the Pandavas with his army and fought against Kauravas in the battle.

One of the great kings of the Kuninda was Rajnah/Rana Amoghabhuti {राणा अमोघभूति}, who ruled in the mountainous valley of the Sutlej and Yamuna rivers (in today's southern Himachal and far western Uttarakhand in northern India around 200B.C.)

The Greek historian Ptolemy linked the origin of the Kuninda to the country where the rivers Beas, Sutlej, Yamuna and Ganges originate.

One of the Edicts of Ashoka on a pillar is also present at Kalsi, in the region of Garhwal, indicating the spread of Buddhism to the region from the 4th century BCE.

The Kuninda kingdom disappeared around the 3rd century, and from the 4th century, it seems the region shifted to Shaivite beliefs.

Kanet Thakurs/Rajputs could be the descendants of Ruling Ranas(Chieftains) of the Ancient Kuninda Tribe.

Distribution
Kanet/Kunait are Mostly found in eastern Himachal Pradesh i.e in Districts like Solan, Mandi, Kullu, Sirmour and Shimla with very few representation in Kangra and Hamirpur.

Location of ancient Kunindas

See also

 Rajputs
 Gaddis
 Ghirth

References

Social groups of Himachal Pradesh
Indian castes
Punjabi tribes